Cesare Ripa (c. 1555, Perugia –  Rome) was an Italian iconographer who worked for Cardinal Anton Maria Salviati as a cook and butler.

Life
Little is known about his life. He was born of humble origin in Perugia about 1555. The exact date of his birth has never been established. He was very active in academic circles as member of the Filomati and the Intronati in Siena, both dedicated to the study of antiquities and of Greek and Latin literature, and the Insensati in his native Perugia.

While still very young he went to Rome to work at the court of Cardinal Antonio Maria Salviati. He attended the Accademia degli Incitati the Accademia di San Luca, where he probably met the Dominican mathematician Ignazio Danti, and was introduced into the learned circles of Baroque Rome. In 1593 he published the first edition (without illustrations) of his Iconologia; the work was highly successful, and went through several editions and subsequent translations. In 1598 Ripa was knighted Cavaliere dell'Ordine dei Santi Maurizio e Lazzaro by the Pope Clement VIII.

Work

The Iconologia was a highly influential emblem book based on Egyptian, Greek and Roman emblematical representations, many personifications. The book was used by orators, artists, poets and "modern Italians" to give substance to qualities such as virtues, vices, passions, arts and sciences. The concepts were arranged in alphabetical order, after the fashion of the Renaissance. For each there was a verbal description of the allegorical figure proposed by Ripa to embody the concept, giving the type and color of its clothing and its varied symbolic attributes, along with the reasons why these were chosen, reasons often supported by references to literature (largely classical).

History

The first edition of his Iconologia was published without illustrations in 1593 and dedicated to Anton Maria Salviati.  A second edition was published in Rome in 1603 this time with 684 concepts and 151 woodcuts, dedicated to Lorenzo Salviati.  Jean Baudoin translated the Iconologia into French and published it in Paris in 1636 under the title Iconologie.  For the French translation, the Flemish engraver Jacob de Bie turned the prints from Ripa's original book into linear figures inside circular frames, thus turning Ripa's allegories into the reverse side of Roman coins.

The book was extremely influential in the 17th and 18th centuries and was quoted extensively in various art forms. In particular, it influenced the painter Pietro da Cortona and his followers. Also Dutch painters like Gerard de Lairesse, Willem van Mieris based work on Ripa's emblems. Vermeer used the emblem for the muse Clio for his The Art of Painting, and several others in his The Allegory of Faith. A large part of Vondel's work cannot be understood without this allegorical source, and ornamentation of the Amsterdam townhall by Artus Quellinus, a sculptor, is totally dependent on Ripa. An English translation appeared in 1709 by Pierce Tempest.

The baroque painter Antonio Cavallucci drew inspiration for his painting Origin of Music from the book. In 1779, the Scottish architect George Richardson's Iconology; or a Collection of Emblematical Figures; containing four hundred and twenty-four remarkable subjects, moral and instructive; in which are displayed the beauty of Virtue and deformity of Vice was published in London. The drawings were by William Hamilton. 

Several editions of the Iconologia appeared throughout Europe in XVII and XVIII centuries (Paris, 1636; Amsterdam, 1644, 1657, 1698; Hamburg, 1659; Frankfurt, 1669-70; Augusta, 1704; London, 1709; Nürburg, 1732-34; Delft, 1726, 1743-50), 

Ripa's work fell out of favor with the rise of neoclassicism in the mid-eighteenth century. In his Versuch einer Allegorie, written between 1759 and 1763, Winckelmann harshly criticizes Ripa. “In the whole of the Iconologia of Cesare Ripa,” snorted Winckelmann, “there are two or three passable allegories.” Winckelmann's attack was effective in the long term, and only recently have scholars rediscovered the seminal importance of Ripa's Iconologia.

See also
Andrea Alciato
Pierio Valeriano Bolzani

References

External links

 

1560s births
People from Perugia
Italian art historians
1620s deaths
Year of death unknown
Artist authors
16th-century Italian writers
17th-century Italian writers